Mavji Maheshwari is a Gujarati short story writer and novelist, chiefly known for his fiction based on the life in Kutch region. He was born on 30 December 1964 in Bhojay, a village in Mandvi of Kutch district, Gujarat, India.

He published his first short story collection Adrashya Diwalo in 2000, which is followed by Ratt-Kachchhi Vartao (2008), Vijog (2009), Pavan (2009), Hastrekha (2012), Surprise (2016) and Khovai Gayeli Gaam (2016). Melo, his first novel, was published in 2007, followed by Meghadambar (2008), Kaandhno Hak (2009), Aganbaan (2013) and Ajani Disha (2015). Ranbheri (2008) and Bor (2009) are two of his collections of plays.

He received several prizes from Gujarati Sahitya Parishad and Gujarat Sahitya Academy for his books. He is also a recipient of Kabir Award, Kakasaheb Kalelkar Prize, Jayant Khatri Award and Kala Gurjari Prize.

See also
 List of Gujarati-language writers

References

External links
 

1964 births
Living people
People from Mandvi
Gujarati-language writers
Indian male novelists
Indian male short story writers
Novelists from Gujarat
21st-century Indian short story writers
21st-century Indian novelists
21st-century Indian male writers